In global health, priority-setting is a term used for the process and strategy of deciding which health interventions to carry out. Priority-setting can be conducted at the disease level (i.e. deciding which disease to alleviate), the overall strategy level (i.e. selective primary healthcare versus primary healthcare versus more general health systems strengthening), research level (i.e. which health research to carry out), or other levels.

Definitions

Priority-setting is the act of deciding which health interventions to carry out, and can occur at several levels of granularity. Priority-setting can occur at the following levels:

 health budget level (i.e. deciding how much to spend on health overall)
 overall strategy level (i.e. selective primary healthcare versus primary healthcare versus more general health systems strengthening)
 disease level (i.e. deciding which disease to alleviate)
 intervention level within each disease (i.e. restricting to a specific disease and prioritizing among interventions for that disease)
 drug level
 research level (i.e. which health research to carry out)

Synonymous terms include "prioritization in health care and health research", "priority determination", "health priorities", and "agenda-setting".

Metrics

Various metrics have been used to compare interventions. These include:

 Disability-adjusted life year per unit cost (used by e.g. Disease Control Priorities Project), quality-adjusted life year, and other forms of cost-effectiveness analysis
 Reasons that the disease burden has persisted
 Adequacy of funding

Who sets the priorities?

Priority-setting can be done by various actors. These include:

 Governments: "In most countries, health spending by governments vastly outpaces international health aid, so governments set most health priorities."
 Non-profits and companies that assist governments
 If a country is using a Health in All Policy (HiAP) approach, then priority-setting is done by stakeholders who do not directly deal with health.
 International organizations
 Foundations
 Private donors (including high-net-worth individuals and ultra-high-net-worth individuals): "A common outcome is a negotiated set of priorities that reflect some domestic needs and some technical, political, and economic considerations defined largely by the interests of donors." In some highly aid-dependent countries, donors "have huge influence on health priorities".

According to Devi Sridhar, professor of global health at the University of Edinburgh, "the priorities of funding bodies largely dictate what health issues and diseases are studied".

Usually at a level of equity and are done by decision-makers closely working alongside marginalized communities and people being influenced. Stakeholder engagement involvements is critical in priority-settings as it establishes if the decisions made by the various actors reflect what the population needs as well as if they are appropriate and accurate. Priority setting decision-makers often make it a point to not only provide assistance and resources but to also give voices to those who are often unheard and invisible in the privileged system. Oftentimes, these priorities address more than just socioeconomic status but also inequalities such as gender, race, and religion inequalities.Policies take a long time to process because of how specific they tend to be.

Once a consensus has been reached between the priority setting makers and the communities, there might be challenges and problems that could arise based on the health intervention being pushed by the priority. Due to the complexity of the inequalities, aspects such as the levels of population health and the distribution of health are being considered which could also be looked at through economical lenses. Although decision makers have the power to constraint and provide aid, there also tends to be an asymmetric information as health organizations might overestimate which priorities are desired.

History of organizations and programs working on priority-setting

According to Amanda Glassman et al., global-level priority-setting has occurred since at least the 1980s, though these efforts have only focused on a few aspects.

The following table is a timeline of organizations and programs working on priority-setting.

Reception

Rudan et al. says that priority-setting efforts have relied on "consensus reached by panels of experts" and as a result have not been systematic enough, and that this has "often made it difficult to present the identified priorities to wider audiences as legitimate and fair".

Glassman et al. notes that criticisms of priority-setting include "the weak data on which estimates of burden, cost, and effectiveness relied; the value judgments implicit in disability-adjusted life year age weighting and discounting decisions; and treatment of equity issues, as well as the political difficulties associated with translating a ground zero package into a public budget based on historical inputs"; and the consideration of only health maximization at the expense of other objectives such as fairness.

Glassman et al. also notes how there are more cost-effectiveness studies for LMICs (in the thousands), but that these are unlikely to be actually applied to priority-setting processes.

Jeremy Shiffman has said that some bodies such as the Institute for Health Metrics and Evaluation and The Lancet are prominent in priority-setting due to their dominion rather than data and analysis, and also notes that the process of creating the Sustainable Development Goals was not sufficiently transparent.

See also 

 Timeline of global health
 Effective altruism
 Cost-benefit analysis
 Global Burden of Disease Study
 10/90 gap
 Health economics
 Health care rationing
 Impact evaluation
 Impact assessment
 Open Philanthropy Project, which does broader prioritization work

References 

Global health